4489 Dracius,, is a large Jupiter trojan from the Greek camp, approximately  in diameter. It was discovered on 15 January 1988, by American astronomer Edward Bowell at the Anderson Mesa Station of the Lowell Observatory near Flagstaff, Arizona, in the United States. The dark D-type asteroid belongs to the 50 largest Jupiter trojans and has a rotation period of 12.58 hours. It was named after Dracius from Greek mythology, who was a commander of the Epeans who fought against Hector.

Orbit and classification 

Dracius is a dark Jovian asteroid orbiting in the leading Greek camp at Jupiter's  Lagrangian point, 60° ahead of its orbit in a 1:1 resonance (see Trojans in astronomy). It is a non-family asteroid in the Jovian background population. It orbits the Sun at a distance of 4.9–5.5 AU once every 11 years and 11 months (4,354 days; semi-major axis of 5.22 AU). Its orbit has an eccentricity of 0.06 and an inclination of 22° with respect to the ecliptic.

Numbering and naming 

This minor planet was numbered on 8 June 1990. As of 2018, it had not been named. On 14 May 2021, the object was named by the Working Group Small Body Nomenclature (WGSBN), after Dracius from Greek mythology, who was a commander of the Epeans of Elis, who defended the Argive ships from Hector's attack during the Trojan War.

Before Dracius was named, it belonged to a small group of only 8 unnamed minor planets with a designated number smaller than 5000. (All of them are Jupiter trojans or near-Earth asteroids). Since then, several have been named :

 3708 Socus  – named in May 2021
 4035 Thestor   – named in May 2021
 4489 Dracius  – named in May 2021
 
 
 4715 Medesicaste  – named in May 2021
 4835 Asaeus

Physical characteristics 

In the SDSS-based taxonomy, as well as in both the Tholen- and SMASS-like taxonomy of the Small Solar System Objects Spectroscopic Survey (S3OS2), Dracius is a dark D-type asteroid. It has also been characterized as a D-type by Pan-STARRS' survey.

On 18 December 2012,  has occulted the star TYC 2467-00054-1 over parts of the United States. The asteroid's brightness was measured at 16.1 and that of the star at 11.1 magnitude.

Rotation period 

Since 1992, several rotational lightcurves of Dracius have been obtained from photometric observations by Stefano Mottola, as well as Daniel Coley and Robert Stephens at the Center for Solar System Studies, California, in collaboration with Linda French and Brian Warner. Lightcurve analysis gave a well-defined rotation period of 12.582 hours with a consolidated brightness amplitude between 0.20 and 0.26 magnitude.

Diameter and albedo 

According to the surveys carried out by the Japanese Akari satellite, the Infrared Astronomical Satellite IRAS, and the NEOWISE mission of NASA's Wide-field Infrared Survey Explorer, Dracius measures between 76.60 and 95.02 kilometers in diameter and its surface has an albedo between 0.050 and 0.069.

The Collaborative Asteroid Lightcurve Link adopts the results obtained by IRAS, that is, an albedo of 0.0514 and a diameter of 92.93 kilometers based on an absolute magnitude of 9.0.

Notes

References

External links 
 Lightcurve Database Query (LCDB), at www.minorplanet.info
 Discovery Circumstances: Numbered Minor Planets (1)–(5000) – Minor Planet Center
 
 

004489
Discoveries by Edward L. G. Bowell
004489
Named minor planets
19880115